Gilbert F. Froment (born 1 October 1930) is a Belgian Professor Emeritus of chemical engineering at the Ghent University, Belgium, and a research professor of Texas A&M University. His career was on the fields of academic kinetic and chemical reaction engineering studies, as well as the application of that fundamental science to problems of industrial relevance.

Froment was elected a member of the National Academy of Engineering in 1999 for the application of fundamental approaches in the analysis of complex, industrially important processes and reactors.

Education 

Gilbert Froment received his chemical engineering degree in 1953 from the Ghent University.  He continued his graduate education at the Ghent University serving as an assistant to Professor Goethals; he earned his Ph.D. in chemical engineering in 1957. Following his degrees, he spent the next two years internationally starting with a year with Professor Schoeneman at the Institute for Chemical Technology in Darmstadt, Germany.  The following year, obtained a fellowship from the Belgian-American Educational Foundation enabling a year at the University of Wisconsin-Madison, where he worked with Professors Olaf Hougen, K.M. Watson, and C.C. Watson on catalytic kinetics and the modeling of catalyst beds.

Tenure at the Ghent University 
In 1959, Froment returned to the Ghent University as associate professor.  In 1968, he was promoted to full professor and director of the Laboratorium voor Petrochemische Techniek until 1996, when he became emeritus professor of the Ghent University. During his time at Ghent, Froment's objective was from the very start of his career to design or simulate industrial catalytic reactors using mathematical models, based on sound theoretical background and adequate experimentation. Froment has contributed continuously and with great authority in developing more mechanistic, and therefore more realistic models, involving more of the detailed transformations of both the fluid molecules and the catalytic surface.

A difficult problem relates to the transport inside the particle, and this has actively been addressed by Froment since the 1980s when the catalyst particle was still dealt with as a single pore or at best as a pseudo continuum. Froment was aware of the need to retain the network topology on the modeling, in particular when pores can be blocked by metals or coke deposition. Froment has been a pioneer in the rationalization and modeling of catalyst deactivation by coke formation. He studied this phenomenon on the three levels: the active site (or clusters thereof), the particle (a network of pores that can be blocked by coke), and the reactor. This led him to apply, at the forefront of the development, Bethe and percolation networks to the description of mass transport and reaction inside catalyst particles, instead of the description in terms of a tortuosity factor.

Another major area where Froment has been active is thermal cracking for olefins production, an operation of tremendous industrial importance, providing the key building blocks for the petrochemical and chemical industries. Froment started research in this area already in 1959, stressing the derivation of accurate kinetic data from experimentation in tubular flow reactors and developing the equivalent reactor volume concept introduced by Hougen and Watson. Continuing this work through the decades led to more advanced and detailed reaction kinetics integrated within reactor models with transport phenomena. This impressive effort, combining heat transfer and three-dimensional computational fluid dynamics calculations, has led to the most advanced furnace models in use today.

Tenure at Texas A&M 
Various universities in the US were interested in hiring him upon his retirement from the Ghent University. He finally opted to join Texas A & M University, where he had several friends, as a "research professor" so that he could concentrate on research and a few seminars for graduate students. Between 1999 and 2015 he directed 9 Ph.D. students and a number of postdocs from all over the world. His research concentrated on the application of the Single Event concept, which he had developed in Belgium, to the complex refining processes such as FCC, hydrocracking, alkylation and petrochemical processes such as MTO (methanol-to-olefins) and oligomerization. Since 2015, he concentrated on the kinetics and design of the Fischer-Tropsch process.

Commitment to excellence in teaching 
Froment has established a record of excellence for instruction of chemical engineering and reaction engineering.  His dedication to teaching has led him all over the world as a visiting professor at other Belgian universities, Katholieke Universiteit Leuven (1967–77) and Université Libre de Bruxelles (1967–69), and at Yale University (1969), University of Houston (1973 and 1981), Universidad Nacional del Sur, Bahia Blanca, Argentina (1977), University of Buenos Aires, Argentina (1981), Universidad de Salta (since 1983), University of Santa Fe, Argentina (1983), and University of Stanford (1984). He also was an adjunct professor at University of Delaware (1980–85).

Textbook: Chemical Reactor Analysis and Design 
In collaboration with his co-author, Dr. Kenneth Bischoff, Froment published his highly influential textbook entitled, "Chemical Reactor Analysis and Design", in 1970.  A second edition was published in 1990, followed by a third edition in 2010.  The textbook has been utilized around the world in the instruction of chemical reaction engineering within chemical engineering curricula.  The impact of the textbook has been attributed to the extensive background of Froment and Bischoff, which provides context into the connections between the macro- and micro-scale phenomena of transport and reaction engineering.

Service to Chemical Reaction Engineering 

Gilbert Froment has been active in professional organizations and supportive of the chemical reaction engineering community. He is the founder of the Chemical Engineering Section of the Koninklijke Vlaamse Ingenieursvereniging and a member of the Working Party on Chemical Reaction Engineering of the European Federation of Chemical Engineering since 1966 and of the Working Party of the Use of Computers in Chemical Engineering since 1968. He has organized many congresses such as those on “Catalyst Deactivation” and “Large Chemical Plants”. He chaired ISCRE-14 in Bruges, Belgium. Froment has also been active as an editor. He was co-editor of Chemical Engineering Science from 1965 until 1996 and of Chemical Reaction Engineering Reviews since 1971 and was a member of the editorial boards of Bulletin des Societes Chimiques Belges, Applied Catalysis, Industrial and Engineering Chemistry, Chemical Engineering Reviews, Revista Latino-Americana de Ingenieria Quimica, and Energie Primaire.

Academic accomplishments 
With over 70 Ph.D. students and over 300 scientific publications, Gilbert has had a significant impact on the science and the practice of Chemical Reaction Engineering.  Froment has been widely recognized, in Belgium and abroad, for his role as an educator and a scientist. He has received the Frederick Swarts Award for Applied Chemistry of the Royal Belgian Academy (1958), the National Alumni Award of the Belgian University Foundation (1966), the Prix Cornez de la Province du Hainaut (1976), and the R. H. Wilhelm Award in Chemical Reaction Engineering from the American Institute of Chemical Engineers (1984). He received a Doctor of Science Honoris Causa degree from Technion, Haifa, Israel (1984), and was elected a member of the Academie Royale Belge des Sciences d’Outre mer in 1981 and a member of the Koninklijke Academie van België, Class of Science, in 1988. In 1999, he was awarded the Villermaux-medal of European Federation of Chemical Engineering. Also in 1999, he was elected a member of the National Academy of Engineering. In 2007, Froment was awarded the Neal R. Amundson Award for Excellence in Chemical Reaction Engineering at the NASCRE Symposium in Houston, TX.

Achievements and key publications 
Gilbert has helped to rutland wrote numerous journal articles describing significant advances in chemical reaction engineering which includes but is not limited to:

References

External links 
Gilbert F. Froment: A Career in Review
U.S. National Academy of Engineering: Gilbert Froment
Neal R. Amundson Reaction Engineering Award Winners

1930 births
Living people
Engineering academics
Belgian chemical engineers
Texas A&M University faculty
Academic staff of Ghent University
Ghent University alumni
University of Wisconsin–Madison fellows
Members of the United States National Academy of Engineering
Academic staff of Technische Universität Darmstadt